Isolotto Monaci Lighthouse is an active lighthouse located on the southernmost of some skerries placed  east of Caprera in the Maddalena archipelago in the Tyrrhenian Sea.

Description
The lighthouse is completely automated, powered by a solar unit, and managed by the Marina Militare with the identification code number 1142 E.F.

On October 5, 2017, a diver, not far from the lighthouse, found some human remains in the place where, on July 26, 1943, a Messerschmitt Me 323 Gigant of the Luftwaffe was shot down by a British Bristol Beaufighter. The German plane was on flight from its base in Sardinia to Pistoia in Tuscany when it was intercepted by the British fighter and shot down.

See also
 List of lighthouses in Italy

References

External links

 Servizio Fari Marina Militare

Lighthouses in Italy
Buildings and structures in Sardinia